Granville Frank Knight (October 12, 1904 – April 1982) was a physician and anti-communist activist.  He was a leading member of the John Birch Society in California.

Life
Knight was born in New York City. He  received an A.B. degree from Dartmouth College in 1926 and an M.D. degree from the Columbia University College of Physicians and Surgeons in 1930. Knight specialized in ear, throat and nose disorders and allergies at his practice in White Plains, New York.  He later moved to California to practice in the fields of allergies and nutrition.

John Birch Society
Knight was a founding member of the John Birch Society in California from 1958-1961.  “Granville proclaimed that a secular nation was condemned to  tremble in fear of atomic annihilation;  that it must sit and wait for the dropped curtain and the closing gate.”

Committee memberships 
Los Angeles County Medical Commission, 1968-1979
President of the Price-Pottenger Nutrition Foundation
President of the Pure Water Association of America

References

External links 
Guide to the Granville Knight papers at the University of Oregon.
Orbis Cascade Alliance Archive

1904 births
1982 deaths
Physicians from New York City
John Birch Society members
American anti-communists
Activists from California